Constantin Iancu (born 26 August 1940) is a Romanian footballer. He played in five matches for the Romania national football team in 1965 and 1966.

References

1940 births
Living people
Romanian footballers
Romania international footballers
Place of birth missing (living people)
Association footballers not categorized by position